Only a Dancing Girl is a 1926 German-Swedish silent drama film directed by Olof Molander and starring Lil Dagover, Walter Janssen and Harry Halm.

The film's sets were designed by Franz Schroedter.

Cast
 Lil Dagover as Marie Berner - varieté dansös
 Walter Janssen as Paul Zentler -notarie, författare
 Harry Halm as Heinrich Zentler -hans bror, åklagere
 Jakob Tiedtke as Ph Zentler, deras far
 Karin Swanström as fru Zentler
 Nils Aréhn as Ludwig Radinger - rådman
 Lucie Höflich as fru Radinger
 Ivan Hedqvist as Heinrich von Wittenberg
 Uno Henning as Fritz Lerma - konstnär
 Hans Albers as Restauranggäst
 Hertha von Walther as Anna Berner - Maries syster
 Clementine Plessner as kokerska hos Zentlers
 Hermann Picha as vän till Zentlers
 Robert Leffler as vän till Zentlers
 Hugo Döblin as  Ej identifierad roll
 Michael Chernof as portvakt hos Zentlers
 Anna-Lisa Ryding as Grete Radinger - Pauls fästmö

References

Bibliography
 Uwe Jens Schumann. Hans Albers: seine Filme, sein Leben. Heyne, 1980.

External links

1926 films
Swedish silent feature films
Films of the Weimar Republic
German silent feature films
Films based on works by Guy de Maupassant
Films directed by Olof Molander
German black-and-white films
Swedish black-and-white films
1926 drama films
German drama films
Swedish drama films
Silent drama films
1920s German films